NotesPeek is a utility written by Ned Batchelder that allows navigation and display of the complete contents of Lotus Notes database files.

NotesPeek displays database components in a tree structure while also providing access to both low level and high level database components. It can show data and settings that otherwise cannot accessed.

References

External links
www.lotus.com NotesPeek
NotesPeek 1.53 tool for viewing Notes databases on Notes 6.x and higher

Lotus Software software